Invitation au voyage is a 1982 French drama film directed by Peter Del Monte. It was entered into the 1982 Cannes Film Festival, where it won the prize for the Best Artistic Contribution.

Cast
 Laurent Malet - Lucien
 Aurore Clément - The young woman
 Mario Adorf - Timour
 Corinne Reynaud - Nina Scott (as Nina Scott)
 Franca Maresa
 Raymond Bussières - Le vieil homme
 Robin Renucci - Gérard
 Serge Spira - Un représentant
 Boris Azais
 Gérald Denizeau - (as Gérard Denizot)
 Guy Dhers
 Ben D'Jackis
 Malek Kateb - (as Malek Eddine Kateb)
 Marcel Gassouk - L'homme au chariot
 Manuela Gourary - La patronne caféteria

References

External links

1982 films
1982 drama films
1980s drama road movies
French drama road movies
Italian drama films
West German films
1980s French-language films
Films directed by Peter Del Monte
Films about death
Films about music and musicians
Films about twins
Incest in film
1980s French films
1980s Italian films